GAL is a 2006 Spanish drama film directed by Miguel Courtois. Inspired by true events, GAL tells the investigation by journalists on the anti-terrorist GAL death squads established illegally by officials of the Spanish government to fight ETA from 1983 to 1992.

Cast 
 José Garcia - Manuel Mallo
 Natalia Verbeke - Marta Castillo
 Jordi Mollà - Paco Ariza
 Ana Álvarez - Soledad Muñoz
  - Gracia
  - Pablo Codina

References

External links 

2006 drama films
2006 films
Spanish drama films
Films directed by Miguel Courtois
2000s Spanish films